Nicholas Naumenko (born July 7, 1974) is an American former professional ice hockey defenseman. He most notably played in the International Hockey League (IHL) and American Hockey League (AHL) before finishing his career with Europe in the Swiss National League A (NLA).

Playing career 
Naumenko was drafted in the eighth round, 182nd overall, in the 1992 NHL Entry Draft by the St. Louis Blues. Naumenko played his college hockey at the University of North Dakota from 1992–96, during his time at UND he played in 146 game for the Fighting Sioux scoring 38 goals and adding 102 assists. Prior to college hockey he played two seasons in the USHL for the Rochester Mustangs and Dubuque Fighting Saints.

Nick's younger brother Gregg Naumenko is also a professional ice hockey goaltender who played two games in the NHL for the Mighty Ducks of Anaheim during the 2000–01 season.

Career statistics

Awards and honors

References

External links 
 

1974 births
Adler Mannheim players
HC Ambrì-Piotta players
American men's ice hockey defensemen
EHC Biel players
Chicago Wolves players
Cleveland Lumberjacks players
Dubuque Fighting Saints players
Grand Rapids Griffins players
Hershey Bears players
Ice hockey people from Chicago
Kansas City Blades players
Kassel Huskies players
Las Vegas Thunder players
Living people
North Dakota Fighting Hawks men's ice hockey players
Portland Pirates players
Rochester Mustangs players
St. Louis Blues draft picks
SCL Tigers players
Utah Grizzlies (AHL) players
Worcester IceCats players